For God Your Soul... For Me Your Flesh is the debut album of the Austrian death metal band Pungent Stench. It was originally released in 1990 on Nuclear Blast. The original CD pressing came with ten bonus track off the split LP with Disharmonic Orchestra and the Extreme Deformity EP. The lyrics mostly deal with Cannibalism and are often tongue-in-cheek.

Track listing
All music written and arranged by Pungent Stench.  All lyrics as noted. Information from liner notes.
 "Intro – Extreme Deformity" – 4:58 (Lyrics: Schirenc)
 "Hypnos" – 3:11 (Lyrics: Alex Wank)
 "For God Your Soul... For Me Your Flesh" – 7:04 (Lyrics: Schirenc)
 "Just Let Me Rot" – 3:46 (Lyrics: Schirenc)
 "Pungent Stench" – 2:34 (Lyrics: Schirenc)
 "Bonesawer" – 3:40 (Lyrics: Wank)
 "Embalmed in Sulphuric Acid" – 2:11 (Lyrics: Wank)
 "Blood, Pus and Gastric Juice" – 4:49 (Lyrics: Wank)
 "Suspended Animation" – 4:41 (Lyrics: Wank)
 "A Small Lunch" – 5:46  (Lyrics: Schirenc)
 "Pulsating Protoplasma" (Bonus track) – 2:52
 "Dead Body Love" (Bonus track) – 4:00
 "Miscarriage" (Bonus track) – 2:20
 "In the Vault" (Bonus track) – 3:00
 "Rip You without Care" (Bonus track) – 3:40
 "Festered Offals" (Bonus track) – 2:54
 "Pungent Stench" (Bonus track) – 2:21
 "Extreme Deformity" (Bonus track) – 4:06
 "Mucous Secretion" (Bonus track) – 2:54
 "Molecular Disembowelment" (Bonus track) – 5:24

Personnel
Martin Schirenc – guitar, vocals
Jacek Perkowski – bass
Alex Wank – drums

Production
Produced, Recorded and Mixed by Pungent Stench, Gregor Znort and Stephan Grujic.
Recorded and mixed at Masterplan Studios.
Mastered at Elaton Studios.
 

Pungent Stench albums
1990 debut albums
Nuclear Blast albums